Xeroplana is a genus of small, air-breathing land snails, terrestrial pulmonate gastropod mollusks in the subfamily Helicellinae  of the family Geomitridae.

Species
 Xeroplana doumeti (Bourguignat, 1876)
 Xeroplana idia (Issel, 1885)

References

 Kobelt, W. (1892). Literaturbericht. Nachrichtsblatt der Deutschen Malakozoologischen Gesellschaft, 24 (7/8): 149-152. Frankfurt am Main
 Manganelli, G., Favilli, L. & Giusti, F. (1997). A revision of three Maghrebian hygromiid genera: Numidia Issel, 1885, Xerofalsa Monterosato, 1892 and Xeroplana Monterosato, 1892 (Pulmonata, Helicoidea). The Veliger, 40: 55-66. Berkeley. 
 Bank, R. A. (2017). Classification of the Recent terrestrial Gastropoda of the World. Last update: July 16th, 2017

External links
 Monterosato, T. A. di. (1892). Molluschi terrestri delle isole adiacenti alla Sicilia. Atti della Reale Accademia di Scienze, Lettere e Belle Arti di Palermo. 3rd Series, 2: 1-34
 Issel, A. (1885). Materiali per lo studio della fauna tunisina raccolti da G. e L. Doria. Annali del Museo Civico di Storia Naturale di Genova. 22: 5-15

Geomitridae